Gail Dennise Thomas Mathieu (born 1951) is the former political advisor to the Commander, United States Transportation Command, Scott Air Force Base, Illinois.  She is the former United States Ambassador to Namibia and former United States Ambassador to Niger.

Life and education
Mathieu is a native of New Jersey, but earned a B.A. degree from Antioch College. She returned to New Jersey and earned her J.D. degree from Rutgers University-Newark.

Career
She was initially an assistant prosecutor for the city of Newark, New Jersey, but then began a career in the Foreign Service.

Other diplomatic posts
2013-2015 – Deputy Assistant Secretary of the Bureau of East Asian and Pacific Affairs for Australia, New Zealand and Pacific Island Affairs
1999–2002 – Deputy Chief of Mission in Accra, Ghana
1997–1999 – Deputy Director of the Office of West African Affairs
1995–1997 – Deputy Director of the Office of Pacific Island Affairs

References

1951 births
Living people
Ambassadors of the United States to Namibia
Ambassadors of the United States to Niger
Antioch College alumni
Rutgers University alumni
African-American diplomats
United States Foreign Service personnel
American women ambassadors
21st-century African-American people
21st-century African-American women
21st-century American diplomats
20th-century African-American people
20th-century African-American women